Russell Kimball (November 1, 1903 – June 29, 1979) was an American art director who worked on more than a hundred and fifty films and television series during his career.

Selected filmography
 In Old California (1942)
 The Affairs of Jimmy Valentine (1942)
 The Girl from Alaska (1942)
 Moonlight Masquerade (1942)
 The Queen of Spies (1942)
 Outlaws of Pine Ridge (1942)
 Perils of Nyoka (1942)
 Call of the Canyon (1942)
 Hit Parade of 1943 (1943)
 London Blackout Murders (1943)
 The Purple V (1943)
 Hit Parade of 1943 (1943)
 The Attorney's Dilemma (1943)
 Whispering Footsteps (1943)
 Man from Music Mountain (1943)
 Mystery Broadcast (1943)
 Tahiti Honey (1943)
 Days of Old Cheyenne (1943)
 The Man from Thunder River (1943)
 Black Hills Express (1943)
 Rosie the Riveter (1944)
 Storm Over Lisbon (1944)
 Stagecoach to Monterey (1944)
 Brazil (1944)
 Lake Placid Serenade (1944)
 Earl Carroll Vanities (1945)
 A Sporting Chance (1945)
 Murder in the Music Hall (1946)
 Affairs of Geraldine (1946)
 The Pilgrim Lady (1947)
 McHale's Navy (1964)
 McHale's Navy Joins the Air Force (1965)
 Three Guns for Texas (1968)

References

Bibliography
  Darby, William. Anthony Mann: The Film Career. McFarland, 2009.

External links

1903 births
1979 deaths
American art directors